The 2018–19 UIC Flames men's basketball team represented the University of Illinois at Chicago in the 2018–19 NCAA Division I men's basketball season. The Flames, led by fourth-year head coach Steve McClain, played their home games at Credit Union 1 Arena as members of the Horizon League. They finished the season 16–16, 10–8 in Horizon League play to finish in a tie for fourth place. They lost in the quarterfinals of the Horizon League tournament to Green Bay.

Previous season
The Flames finished the 2017–18 season 20–16, 12–6 in Horizon League play to finish in third place. They lost in the quarterfinals of the Horizon League tournament to Milwaukee. They were invited to the CollegeInsider.com Tournament where they defeated Saint Francis (PA), Austin Peay, and Liberty to advance to the championship game where they lost to Northern Colorado.

Roster

Schedule and results

|-
! colspan="9" style=| Exhibition

|-
! colspan="9" style=| Non-conference season

|-
!colspan=9 style=| Horizon League regular season

|-
!colspan=9 style=|Horizon League tournament
|-

|-

Notes

References

UIC Flames
UIC Flames men's basketball seasons
UIC Flames men's basket
UIC Flames men's basket